Alresford may refer to:
 Alresford, Essex, a village in Essex, England
 New Alresford, a small town in Hampshire, England
 Old Alresford, a village in Hampshire, England
 Alresford Cricket Club, which represented New Alresford and Old Alresford in the late 18th century
 Deanery of Alresford, which includes New Alresford and Old Alresford and other parishes